The 2019 ANZ Premiership season was the third season of Netball New Zealand's ANZ Premiership. With a team coached by Yvette McCausland-Durie, captained by Katrina Grant and featuring Karin Burger, Aliyah Dunn, Ameliaranne Ekenasio and Sulu Fitzpatrick, Central Pulse finished the regular season as minor premiers. In the grand final, Pulse defeated Northern Stars 52–48, winning their first premiership.

Transfers

Head coaches and captains

Pre-season
The official pre-season tournament was held at Te Wānanga o Raukawa in Otaki on February 8–10, with all six teams competing.

Day 1

 
 

 
Day 2

 
  
 
 
Day 3

Regular season

Round 1
The season was brought forward by two months to ensure it did not clash with the 2019 Netball World Cup. It began with a Super Sunday event hosted by Waikato Bay of Plenty Magic.

Round 2

Round 3

Round 4

Round 5

Round 6
The second Super Sunday event was hosted at The Trusts Arena. There were wins for Northern Stars, Central Pulse and Southern Steel.

Round 7

Round 8

Round 9

Round 10

Round 11
The third Super Sunday was hosted at Stadium Southland. There were wins for Central Pulse, Southern Steel and Mainland Tactix.

Round 12

Round 13

Final ladder

Finals Series

Elimination final

Grand final

Award winners

New Zealand Netball Awards

Team of the season
Brendon Egan selected Stuff's team of the season.

Season statistics
Best of each team

References

  
2019
2019 in New Zealand netball